On 12 February 2015, the Islamic State of Iraq and the Levant (ISIL) released a report in their online magazine Dabiq showing photos of 21 Egyptian Coptic Christian construction workers that they had kidnapped in the city of Sirte, Libya, and whom they threatened to kill. The men, who came from different villages in Egypt, 13 of them from Al-Our, Minya Governorate, were kidnapped in Sirte in two separate attacks on 27 December 2014, and in January 2015. This was not the first time that Egyptians in Libya had been the subject of abuse for political reasons, a pattern that goes back to the 1950s.

In 2014, a militia group in eastern Libya declared its affiliation with ISIL and then took over parts of Derna in late 2014. People allied to the group claimed responsibility for attacks across the country, including the Corinthia Hotel attack in January 2015.

On 19 April 2015, ISIL released another video in which they murdered about 30 Ethiopian Christians.

Video
On 15 February 2015, a five-minute video was published, showing the beheading of the captives on a beach along the southern Mediterranean coast. A caption in the video called the captives the "People of the Cross, followers of the hostile Egyptian Church". In the video, the leader was dressed in camouflage, while the other terrorists were dressed in black. The victims were all dressed in orange jumpsuits, as in many previous ISIL videos. The leader declared in North-American English:

Oh people, recently you've seen us on the hills of Al-Sham (Greater Syria) and on Dabiq's Plain, chopping off the heads that had been carrying the cross delusion for a long time, filled with spite against Islam and Muslims, and today we... are sending another message: Oh crusaders, safety for you will be only wishes especially when you're fighting us all together, therefore we will fight you all together until the war lays down its burdens and Jesus peace be upon him will descend, breaking the cross, killing the swine. The sea you've hidden Sheikh Osama bin Laden's body in, we swear to Allah we will mix it with your blood.

After beheading the hostages, a message appears on the screen: "The filthy blood is just some of what awaits you, in revenge for Camelia and her sisters." This was referencing Camelia Shehata, a Coptic Egyptian woman and wife of a Coptic priest who Islamists believe had converted to Islam and was detained by the Coptic Church because of it. (She later denied the claim.) Finally the speaker declares "We will conquer Rome, by Allah's permission," pointing his knife toward the sea. As in other ISIL videos, the captives wore orange jumpsuits, intended as a reference to the attire of prisoners in the Guantanamo Bay detention camp. The group of killers identified itself in the video as the "Tripoli Province" of ISIL. The leader of the squad performing the killings was identified as a Libyan expatriate who goes by the nom de guerre Al Qaqa'a Ben Omro.

The Coptic Church of Egypt, Egyptian government, as well as the Libyan parliament, confirmed the deaths.

Later, when one of the perpetrators of the operation was arrested, he admitted in the investigation that the slaughter had taken place at the beach opposite Al Mahary Hotel in Sirte.

Aftermath
The President of Egypt Abdel Fattah el-Sisi announced a seven-day period of national mourning and called for an urgent meeting with the country's top security body. In a televised address, al-Sisi declared his country reserved the right for retaliation. He also reiterated an offer to facilitate Egyptians' evacuation from Libya and imposed a travel ban on citizens to Libya. Al-Azhar also condemned the incident. The killings were also addressed particularly by the United Nations Security Council, French President François Hollande and U.S. Secretary of State John Kerry. Roman Catholic Pope Francis telephoned Coptic Pope Tawadros II to offer his condolences. At an ecumenical meeting with the Moderator of the General Assembly of the Church of Scotland, Pope Francis stated "They only said Jesus help me The blood of our Christian brothers is testimony that cries out. Be they Catholic, Orthodox, Copts, Lutherans, it doesn't matter: They're Christian!" The Ministry of Foreign Affairs and Trade of Hungary provided financial support of €500 for each families of the victims. Péter Szijjártó said "Hungary cannot be a bystander of the continuous attacks against Christian communities in the Middle East". The Obama administration was criticized for referring to the victims simply as Egyptian citizens rather than Christians, the express reason for their murder.<ref>New York Times: "Is This the End of Christianity in the Middle East? – ISIS and other extremist movements across the region are enslaving, killing and uprooting Christians, with no aid in sight" By ELIZA GRISWOLD  22 July 2015 | "Daniel Philpott, a professor of political science at the University of Notre Dame, says, When ISIS is no longer said to have religious motivations nor the minorities it attacks to have religious identities, the Obama administration's caution about religion becomes excessive."</ref>

Egyptian airstrikes

On 16 February, at dawn, Egyptian military conducted airstrikes on ISIL facilities in Libya. The airstrikes targeted ISIL training locations and weapons stockpiles. All military aircraft returned safely to base. Libyan air force also conducted strikes in Derna, occupied by an ISIL affiliate since 2014. About 40–50 militants and 7 civilians were reportedly killed.

Canonization
On 21 February 2015, a week after their death, the Pope of the Coptic Orthodox Church, Pope Tawadros II of Alexandria canonized the 21 Coptic Martyrs as saints. Their feast day would be celebrated on 15 February of the Gregorian calendar. The commemoration falls on the feast of the Presentation of Jesus at the Temple which is 8th Amshir of the Coptic calendar.

21st victim
After the beheadings, the Coptic Orthodox church released their names, but there were only 20 names. In the video, the leader's victim was of black African descent, in contrast to the others, who were ethnic Copts. It was later learned that this 21st victim was named Matthew Ayariga and that he was from Ghana. (A few sources say he was from Chad, but most say he was from Ghana.)

It is most likely that he was already a Christian, because sources reported that he said "I am a Christian and I am like them". In October 2020, Christian News Now reported that "Ayariga was a Christian migrant worker from Ghana".  In the book The 21: A Journey into the Land of Coptic Martyrs, Martin Mosebach, who traveled to Egypt to meet the families of the martyrs, also states that Ayariga said "I am a Christian".

However, according to some unnamed sources, he was not originally a Christian, but he saw the immense faith of the others, and when the terrorists asked him if he rejected Jesus, he reportedly said, "Their God is my God", knowing that he would be killed.

When the remains of the 21 bodies were found, the bodies of the 20 Egyptians were returned into Egypt except for the body of Matthew Ayariga. On September 29, 2020, Matthew Ayariga's remains were finally received in Egypt by the new church in Al Our, the Church of the Martyrs of Faith and Homeland, a shrine built in honor of the 21 martyrs. The family members of the other martyrs "expressed their joy at the return of the remains of the martyr [Matthew Ayariga]", saying "Our joy is complete." Majid Shehata, a daughter of one of the martyrs, said, "It was a surprise to all of us that we see the remains of the martyr Matthew inside the Church of the Martyrs, and this is a long-awaited news and all the families are in great joy and we thank God for having responded to us in the return of the martyr."

Return of the remains
After the expulsion of fighters of the Islamic state organization from the Libyan city of Sirte, government authorities announced it has found a place where the bodies of Coptic martyrs were buried. This was done after the government authorities and the Libyan army arrested one of the terrorists who was present during the slaughter. The Libyan Attorney General has ordered cooperation with the Egyptian authorities to send DNA samples taken from the families of the martyrs to be compared with DNA samples taken from the remains of the martyrs.

Later, it was ascertained that the remains belonged to the Coptic martyrs after comparing the samples of the DNA from martyrs families they sent by Egyptian Forensic Medicine Authority with DNA samples taken from the remains by the Libyan Forensic Medicine Commission.https://www.alarabiya.net/ar/arab-and-world/egypt/2018/05/14/مصر-تستعد-لاستقبال-ودفن-رفات-ضحايا-داعش-ليبيا.html

On 15 May 2018, the remains of the 20 Egyptians (the body of the Ghananian, Matthew Ayariga, was not on the plane), were returned to the cathedral, which was built for them and named after them (Church of martyrs of the faith and homeland) in martyrs village (formerly Al Aour or Al Awar or Al Our ) in Minya governorate. A special shrine has been built in which the remains were laid so that people can visit them. Churches and monasteries' bells were rung all over Egypt when the remains arrived on board a plane coming from Misrata Airport in Libya to Cairo International Airport; Celebrations of the return of their remains to the homeland. They were received by Pope Tawadros II of Alexandria and a large number of priests and Ambassador Nabila Makram, the Egyptian minister of Immigration and Egyptians Affairs Abroad, and officials of the organs of the state at the airport. The Holy Mass in church was presided over by Bishop of Samalout Anba Baphnotius.https://www.youm7.com/story/2018/5/15/صور-توافد-أهالى-سمالوط-فى-المنيا-على-مزار-شهداء-الإيمان/3794666 

One year later, on 25 July 2019, The Coptic Orthodox Church in Egypt officially requested the Libyan Embassy in Cairo to ship the body of Matthew Ayariga to Egypt. Anba Pavnotios dispatched an official delegation to meet Chargè D'Affaires of the Libyan Embassy in Cairo, Fawzy al-Mabrouk Tantoush.

The delegation included the priests of the Cathedral of the Martyrs of the Faith and Homeland in Al-Our, Minya, Egypt, Fr. Marcos Atef and Fr. Epiphanius Yunan, Nevine Ragy, General Manager of Schools and Projects of the Coptic Orthodox Diocese of Samalout and Nader Shukry, member of the board on the Church of the Martyrs of the Faith and Homeland, and coordinator of crisis management for the martyrs families. Hussein Al-Bashir Shafsha, the Libyan Embassy's Social attache, attended the meeting.

The Egyptians started with thanking the Libyan authorities for their invaluable cooperation and help in bringing home the bodies of the Coptic martyrs, and stressing that the Pope of the Coptic Orthodox Church Pope Tawadros II of Alexandria, Anba Pachomius, Metropolitan of Beheira and Pentapolis (Eastern Libya), and Anba Pavnotios always prayed for peace in Libya. They handed Mr. Tantoush a letter from Anba Pavnotios requesting that the body of Matthew Ayariga by the Copts, would be brought to Egypt "to be joined with his Coptic brothers in their final resting place". The Metropolitan said the Church would give all the necessary legal pledges and guarantees to honour the rights of all parties should his country ask to have him back.

In 2019, the Libyan government agreed to transfer the body of Matthew Ayariga to Egypt.
His remains were finally transferred to Egypt and laid to rest with the other martyrs at the end of September 2020.

Names

 Book 
The lives of the beheaded Copts has been detailed in a book by Martin Mosebach called The 21 – A Journey into the Land of Coptic Martyrs.''

See also

Persecution of Copts
Copts in Libya
ISIL beheading incidents
Christian martyrs
New Martyr

References

External links
 Updated list of the names of the new martrys of Libya

21st-century Christian martyrs
Christian martyrs executed by decapitation
Christian saints killed by Muslims
Coptic history
Groups of Christian martyrs of the Late Modern era
ISIL terrorist incidents in Libya
Mass murder in 2015
People beheaded by the Islamic State of Iraq and the Levant
Persecution of Copts by ISIL
Terrorist incidents in Libya in 2015
Victims of Islamic terrorism